Eugène Marie Chantrelle murdered his wife and former pupil Elizabeth Chantrelle (née Dyer) on 2 January 1868, and was convicted for his crimes and hanged at Calton Prison in Edinburgh, Scotland. The trial is claimed to have inspired Robert Louis Stevenson to write a story Strange Case of Dr Jekyll and Mr Hyde in which the socially-respectable character Henry Jekyll has a violent and monstrous alter-ego named Edward Hyde. Stevenson met Eugène Chantrelle, the basis for Jekyll/Hyde, at the home of Victor Richon (Stevenson's old French master).

Background 

Eugène Chantrelle was born 1834 in Nantes and by 1878 was a French teacher who lived in Edinburgh and taught at the private Newington Academy. He began a relationship with a pupil, Elizabeth Dyer (born 1863, 15 years old at the time). They married when she was 16 years old, moved in together at 81a George Street, and Elizabeth gave birth to their first child 2 months after they were married.

Victimisation 

The marriage was not a happy one from the start. His trial heard that in addition to physical violence, he regularly threatened to poison her. In August 1877, he took out a £1000 life insurance policy against her accidental death. She was found unconscious on the morning of 2 January 1878 and later died in hospital. Subsequently, traces of opium were found in vomit on her nightgown and so the death was suspected to be criminal in nature.

Arrest, trial, and execution 

He was arrested after her funeral at Grange Cemetery on 5 January 1878.

He pleaded not guilty to her murder. His trial lasted four days and he was convicted by a jury within an hour and ten minutes.

He was hanged in the grounds of Calton Prison on 31 May and his body buried in an unmarked grave on that site.

Aftermath 

In 1906 the trial was included in a series of articles on Scottish trials published by The Spectator magazine.

References 

1834 births
1863 births
1878 deaths
people from Nantes
people from Edinburgh
French emigrants to the United Kingdom
French people convicted of murder
people executed by Scotland by hanging
19th-century executions by Scotland